Chota Nagpur Division, also known as the South-West Frontier, was an administrative division of British India. It included most of the present-day state of Jharkhand as well as adjacent portions of West Bengal, Orissa, and Chhattisgarh.

History

Chota Nagpur division was a hilly and forested area. The region came under the control of the British in the 18th and 19th centuries, and was annexed to the Bengal Presidency, the largest province of British India. After the Kol rebellion of 1831-2, the division was exempted by Regulation XIII of 1833 from the general laws and regulations governing Bengal, and every branch of the administration was vested in an officer appointed by the supreme Government and called the Agent to the Governor-General of India for the South-West Frontier.

In 1854 the designation of South-West Frontier Agency was changed to Chota Nagpur and it began to be administered as a Non-regulation province under the Lieutenant Governor of the then Bihar. It was changed to Chota Nagpur by Act XX of that year, and was administered thereafter as a non-regulation province under the Lieutenant-Governor of Bengal Presidency. The title of the chief administrative officer was changed from Agent to Commissioner, and the officers in charge of the districts became Deputy Commissioners. The Commissioner exercised general control over the Chota Nagpur States. The present Divisional Commissioner is Shri. Surendra Singh Meena of the Indian Administrative Service (IAS)

Chota Nagpur Division became part of the new province of Bihar and Orissa when it was created in 1912. In 1936 the province was split into the separate provinces of Bihar and Orissa, and the princely states were placed under the authority of the Eastern States Agency.

Administration

The administrative headquarters of the division was at Ranchi. The total area of the division was 27,101 square miles (70,161 km2.), and the population was 4,900,429 in 1901. In 1901 Hindus constituted 68.5% of the total population, animists 22.7%, Muslims 5.7%, Christians 2.9%, and 853 Jains. The Chota Nagpur States, a group of princely states, was under the political authority of the division's commissioner.

Districts
The division included five districts:
 Hazaribagh
Ranchi
Palamu
Manbhum
Singhbhum

See also
Chota Nagpur Tributary States

References

 Goswami Prodipto, Untold Story of Chota Nagpur: Its Journey with the Colonial Army 1767-1947, Chennai: Notion Press (2020)

External links

 

Divisions of British India
History of Jharkhand
1854 establishments in British India